Cheng Mei-chi (born 1 November 1959) is a Taiwanese former  professional golfer who played on the LPGA of Japan Tour and the LPGA Tour.

Cheng won twice on the LPGA of Japan Tour and once on the LPGA Tour in 1988.

Professional wins (9)
this list is incomplete

LPGA Tour wins (1)

LPGA Tour playoff record (1–0)

LPGA of Japan Tour (2)
1996 Mitsubishi Electric Ladies Golf Tournament 
1999 Sankyo Lady Cup

Ladies Asian Golf Tour (2)
1986 Tainan Open
1995 Taiwan Open

References

External links

Taiwanese female golfers
LPGA of Japan Tour golfers
LPGA Tour golfers
1959 births
Living people